The Tenorio River in Costa Rica rises near the Tenorio Volcano where it becomes a fast moving river, with some areas of rapids popular for white-water rafting and flows to join the Corobicí River.

Rivers of Costa Rica